Cap-Pelé ([kap pəle]) is an unincorporated community in Westmorland County, New Brunswick, Canada. It held village status prior to 2023.

The community centres on the intersection of Route 945 and Route 133 but extends to Route 950.

Its sister city is Broussard, Louisiana, United States.

Geography
It is located on the Northumberland Strait approximately 50 kilometres (30 miles) east of Moncton.  Approximately 88% of its residents are Francophone.

History

The village was founded by Acadians in 1780 and incorporated as a municipality in 1969. Fishing is the dominant industry, and the town is home to several smoked herring processing plants known locally as boucannières. As many as 30 smokehouses are found in Cap-Pelé and its surrounding areas. Work in the smokehouses tends to be seasonal, and during the summertime certain smokehouses offer guided tours.

The post office's name was changed from Cape Bald to Cap-Pelé by petition of local residents in 1949. The name was approved on March 2, 1950.

On 1 January 2023, Cap-Pelé amalgamated with the incorporated rural community of Beaubassin Eastto form the new town of Cap-Acadie. The community's name remains in official use.

Aboiteau Beach
Cap-Pelé is home to the well known Aboiteau Beach that stretches out for approximately 2.5 kilometres (1½ miles), located inside Aboiteau Park. The beachside complex offers many services including a licensed restaurant with seafood and bar service, a gift shop and a patio overlooking the strait.

Demographics 

Income (2016)

Mother tongue (2016)

Notable people

See also
List of communities in New Brunswick

References

External links
 Village of Cap-Pelé

Communities in Westmorland County, New Brunswick
Former villages in New Brunswick
Communities in Greater Shediac